Sophie Petzal (born 4 November 1990) is a British screenwriter, best known for creating the Irish crime drama, Blood.

Career
Having written comedy shorts as a child, Petzal first gained attention with her script, The God Committee, one of the winners of All Mixed Up, a competition run in conjunction with the Triforce Creative Network and BBC Comedy. The script secured her an agent. While studying screenwriting at Bournemouth University, Petzal secured a place as a BBC Production Trainee. Her script Sanctioned won the Sir Peter Ustinov Television Scriptwriting Award at the International Emmys. Following a trainee placement at CBBC in script editing, she started writing for several CBBC shows, including Wolfblood, Hetty Feather, The Dumping Ground and Danger Mouse. She subsequently moved into hour-long drama, writing episodes of Jekyll and Hyde (produced by Foz Allen, who was also the producer on Wolfblood and Hetty Feather), Medici, The Last Kingdom and Riviera.

In 2018, Petzal's first original TV drama series Blood, starring Adrian Dunbar and Carolina Main, aired on TV3 and Channel 5. Her script for Blood won Best Long-Form Drama at the Writers' Guild Of Great Britain Awards. It was renewed for a second series, which began broadcasting in April 2020. It was announced in February 2020 that Petzal was writing a four-part thriller for ITV, Hollington Drive. It would start broadcast on 29 September, 2021.

On December 13, 2020, it was announced Petzal would helm an adaptation of The Seven Deaths of Evelyn Hardcastle for Netflix.

References

External links
 

1990 births
21st-century British women writers
British women screenwriters
British women television writers
Women science fiction and fantasy writers
Living people
21st-century British screenwriters